Floraconus is a subgenus  of sea snails, marine gastropod mollusks in the genus Conus, family Conidae, the cone snails and their allies.

In the latest classification of the family Conidae by Puillandre N., Duda T.F., Meyer C., Olivera B.M. & Bouchet P. (2015), Eugeniconus has become a subgenus of Conus as Conus (Eugeniconus) represented as Conus Linnaeus, 1758

Distinguishing characteristics
The Tucker & Tenorio 2009 taxonomy distinguishes Floraconus from Conus in the following ways:

 Genus Conus sensu stricto Linnaeus, 1758
 Shell characters (living and fossil species)
The basic shell shape is conical to elongated conical, has a deep anal notch on the shoulder, a smooth periostracum and a small operculum. The shoulder of the shell is usually nodulose and the protoconch is usually multispiral. Markings often include the presence of tents except for black or white color variants, with the absence of spiral lines of minute tents and textile bars.
Radular tooth (not known for fossil species)
The radula has an elongated anterior section with serrations and a large exposed terminating cusp, a non-obvious waist, blade is either small or absent and has a short barb, and lacks a basal spur.
Geographical distribution
These species are found in the Indo-Pacific region.
Feeding habits
These species eat other gastropods including cones.

 Subgenus Floraconus Iredale, 1930
Shell characters (living and fossil species)
The shell is turgid to conical in shape.  The protoconch is paucispiral, and the spire whorl tops have cords.  Nodules are either absent or die out in early whorls.  The dentiform plait may be small or absent. The anal notch is shallow, and the anterior notch is slight or absent. The periostracum may be smooth or tufted, and the operculum is moderate to small.
Radular tooth (not known for fossil species)
The anterior section of the radular tooth may be equal to or slightly longer than the posterior section. The blade is short to moderate extending about one-third to one-half the length of the anterior section.  The basal spur is present, and the barb is short. The radular tooth has a single row of serrations.
Geographical distribution
The species in this genus are endemic to Australia.
Feeding habits
These cone snails are vermivorous (meaning that the cones prey on marine worms) feeding upon polychaete worms.

Species list
This list of species is based on the information in the World Register of Marine Species (WoRMS) list. Species within the genus Floraconus include:
 Floraconus anemone (Lamarck, 1810) represented as  Conus anemone Lamarck, 1810
 Floraconus aplustre (Reeve, 1843) represented as  Conus aplustre Reeve, 1843
 Floraconus ardisiaceus Kiener, 1850 : synonym of Conus (Floraconus) ardisiaceus Kiener, 1850, represented as Conus ardisiaceus Kiener, 1850 
 Floraconus balteatus G. B. Sowerby I, 1833 : synonym of Conus (Floraconus) balteatus G. B. Sowerby I, 1833, represented as Conus balteatus G. B. Sowerby I, 1833 
 Floraconus cocceus (Reeve, 1844) represented as  Conus cocceus Reeve, 1844
 Floraconus compressus G. B. Sowerby II, 1866 : synonym of Conus (Floraconus) compressus G. B. Sowerby II, 1866, represented as Conus compressus G. B. Sowerby II, 1866 
 Floraconus gabelishi (da Motta & Ninomiya, 1982) represented as  Conus gabelishi da Motta & Ninomiya, 1982
 Floraconus klemae (Cotton, 1953): synonym of Conus (Klemaeconus) klemae (Cotton, 1953), represented as  Conus klemae (Cotton, 1953)
 Floraconus mozambicus Hwass in Bruguière, 1792: synonym of Conus (Floraconus) mozambicus Hwass in Bruguière, 1792, represented as Conus mozambicus Hwass in Bruguière, 1792
 Floraconus novaehollandiae(A. Adams, 1855) represented as  Conus anemone novaehollandiae A. Adams, 1855
 Floraconus papilliferus (G.B. Sowerby I, 1834): synonym of Conus (Floraconus) papilliferus G. B. Sowerby I, 1834, represented as  Conus papilliferus G. B. Sowerby I, 1834
 Floraconus rufimaculosus (Macpherson, 1959): synonym of Conus (Klemaeconus) rufimaculosus Macpherson, 1959 represented as  Conus rufimaculosus Macpherson, 1959
 Floraconus tinianus Hwass in Bruguière, 1792 : synonym of Conus (Floraconus) tinianus Hwass in Bruguière, 1792, represented as Conus tinianus Hwass in Bruguière, 1792

References

Further reading 
 Kohn A. A. (1992). Chronological Taxonomy of Conus, 1758-1840". Smithsonian Institution Press, Washington and London.
 Monteiro A. (ed.) (2007). The Cone Collector 1: 1-28.
 Berschauer D. (2010). Technology and the Fall of the Mono-Generic Family The Cone Collector 15: pp. 51-54
 Puillandre N., Meyer C.P., Bouchet P., and Olivera B.M. (2011), Genetic divergence and geographical variation in the deep-water Conus orbignyi complex (Mollusca: Conoidea)'', Zoologica Scripta 40(4) 350–363.

External links
 To World Register of Marine Species
  Gastropods.com: Conidae setting forth the genera recognized therein.

Conidae
Gastropod subgenera